The 2022 Brownlow Medal was the 95th year the award is presented to the player adjudged the best and fairest player during the Australian Football League (AFL) home-and-away season. It was won by Carlton midfielder Patrick Cripps. The 2022 Brownlow Medal count was originally scheduled for Monday 19 September, its traditional date on the Monday before the grand final. It was rescheduled to Sunday 18 September at a week's notice, to avoid a clash with the funeral of Elizabeth II. The event returned to its conventional format and venue—a gala dinner at the Crown Palladium in Melbourne—after having been held virtually for the previous two seasons due to the COVID-19 pandemic.

Cripps' win was not without controversy. Cripps was initially suspended by the Match Review Panel and AFL Tribunal in Round 21, for rough conduct in an front-on contest against ' Callum Ah Chee, which ruled him ineligible and would have seen him miss the final rounds, in which he polled the winning votes; Carlton had appealed the suspension to the AFL Appeals Board and was successful in overturning it.

Carlton became the first team since Richmond in 2012 to win the Coleman and Brownlow and not play finals. West Coast, which finished 17th with a 2-20 record, polled only 15 votes across all of its players combined,  the lowest ever tally for any club under the 3–2–1 voting system in a season of any length.

Leading vote-getters

Voting procedure
The three field umpires (those umpires who control the flow of the game, as opposed to goal or boundary umpires) confer after each match and award three votes, two votes, and one vote to the players they regard as the best, second-best and third-best in the match, respectively. The votes are kept secret until the awards night, and they are read and tallied on the evening.

Allegations of illegal betting
Several raids and arrests, including of second year field umpire Michael Pell, were made in November 2022 after suspicious betting patterns into spot bets on the votes from many games Pell had umpired were investigated by sports corruption police. As of 15 December, investigations were ongoing and no charges have been formally laid, and Pell was no longer employed by the AFL.

References

2022 Australian Football League season
2022